Free play is a literary concept from Jacques Derrida's 1966 essay, "Structure, Sign, and Play in the Discourse of the Human Sciences". In his essay, Derrida speaks of a philosophical "event" that has occurred to the historic foundation of structure. Before the "event", man was the center of all things. After the "event", however, man could no longer be judged the center of the universe. Without this centralized reference, all that is left is "free play".

[U]p until the event which I wish to mark out and define, structure—or rather the structurality of structure—although it has always been involved, has always been neutralized or reduced, and this by a process of giving it a center or referring it to a point of presence, a fixed origin. The function of this center was not only to orient, balance, and organize the structure—one cannot in fact conceive of an unorganized structure—but above all to make sure that the organizing principle of the structure would limit what we might call the freeplay of the structure. No doubt that by orienting and organizing the coherence of the system, the center of a structure permits the freeplay of its elements inside the total form. And even today the notion of a structure lacking any center represents the unthinkable itself.— "Structure, Sign and Play" in Writing and Difference, p. 278

 Besides the tension of freeplay with history, there is also the tension of freeplay with presence. Freeplay is the disruption of presence. The presence of an element is always a signifying and substitutive reference inscribed in a system of differences and the movement of a chain. Freeplay is always an interplay of absence and presence, but if it is to be radically conceived, freeplay must be conceived of before the alternative of presence and absence; being must be conceived of as presence or absence beginning with the possibility of freeplay and not the other way around.—"Structure, Sign and Play" in Writing and Difference, p. 294

References 
 Barry, Peter. Beginning Theory. Manchester: Manchester University Press. 2002. pp. 66–70
 Derrida, Jacques. Writing and Difference. Trans. Alan Bass. London: Routledge, pp. 278–294

Deconstruction
Literary criticism
Concepts in the philosophy of history
Postmodern theory
Jacques Derrida
Play (activity)